Bayunovskiye Klyuchi is a rural locality (a selo) and the administrative center of Bayunovoklyuchevsky Selsoviet, Pervomaysky District, Altai Krai, Russia. The population was 1,569 as of 2013. There are 24 streets.

Geography 
Bayunovskiye Klyuchi is located 25 km southeast of Novoaltaysk (the district's administrative centre) by road. Bayunovo is the nearest rural locality.

References 

Rural localities in Pervomaysky District, Altai Krai